Larry Phillips may refer to:
Larry Phillips (Washington politician), member of the King County Council in Washington state
Larry Eugene Phillips, Jr. (1970–1997), bank robber
Larry Phillips (racing driver) (1942–2004), five-time NASCAR Weekly Series national champion
Larry Phillips (Texas politician) (born 1966), incoming state district court judge and former member of the Texas House of Representatives